Tonje Haug Lerstad (born 9 October 1996) is a Norwegian handball player who plays for Sola HK.

She is also a part of Norway's national recruit team in handball.

She also represented Norway at the 2016 Women's Junior World Handball Championship, placing 5th, at the 2015 Women's Under-19 European Handball Championship, placing 6th, at the 2014 Women's Youth World Handball Championship, placing 13th and at the 2013 Youth European Championship, placing 7th.

Achievements
Norwegian League:
 Silver: 2019/2020, 2020/2021
 Bronze: 2021/2022
Norwegian Cup:
Finalist: 2019

Individual awards
 All-Star Goalkeeper of the European Women's U-19 Handball Championship: 2015.

References

1996 births
Living people
Sportspeople from Trondheim
Norwegian female handball players
21st-century Norwegian women